The Danish Association of Chartered Surveyors is a trade union in Denmark. It has a membership of 1400.

External links

Trade unions in Denmark
Trade unions established in 1875